Philip Geoffrey Amm (2 April 1964 – 10 September 2015) was a South African cricketer who played first-class cricket for Border and Eastern Province in South Africa from 1982 to 1998. He also played 138 List A matches from 1984 to 1998.

References

External links
 
 Philip Amm at CricketArchive

1964 births
2015 deaths
South African cricketers
People from Makhanda, Eastern Cape
Eastern Province cricketers
Border cricketers
Cricketers from the Eastern Cape